The 2017–18 Georgia Tech Yellow Jackets women's basketball team represented Georgia Institute of Technology during the 2017-18 NCAA Division I women's basketball season. Returning as head coach was MaChelle Joseph in her 15th season. The team played its home games at Hank McCamish Pavilion in Atlanta, Georgia as members of the Atlantic Coast Conference.

They finished the season 20–14, 6–10 in ACC play to finish in ninth place. They advanced to the second round of the ACC women's tournament where they lost to Virginia. They were invited to the Women's National Invitation Tournament and advanced to the third round, where they lost to Alabama.

Previous season
They finished the 2016-17 season 22–15, 5–11 in ACC play to finish in tenth place. They advanced to the second round of the ACC women's tournament where they lost to Miami (FL). They were invited to the Women's National Invitation Tournament where they advanced to the championship game where they lost to Michigan.

2017–18 media
All Yellow Jackets games will air on the Yellow Jackets IMG Sports Network. WREK once again serves as the home of the Ramblin Wreck women's basketball team.

Roster

Schedule

|-
!colspan=9 style=""| Non-conference regular season

|-
!colspan=9 style=""| ACC regular season

|-
!colspan=9 style=""| ACC Women's Tournament

|-
!colspan=9 style=""| WNIT

Source

Rankings

See also
2017-18 Georgia Tech Yellow Jackets men's basketball team

References

Georgia Tech Yellow Jackets women's basketball seasons
Georgia Tech
Georgia Tech